Operation Bretagne was a French Union military operation between 1 December 1952 and 4 January 1953, during the First Indochina War.

Four Mobile Groups (Groupes Mobiles, GM) and General de Berchoux's two Amphibian Sub-Groups hunted and engaged the 9th Regiment (304th Division) and the 48th Regiment (320th Division) who were threatening the bishopric of Bui Chu. Defeated, the Việt Minh split in small groups, disguised themselves with peasant clothes and escaped to the south.

References

External links
 French Defense Ministry archives ECPAD, Pierre Ferrari war reportage, 31 December 1952

Conflicts in 1952
Battles involving Vietnam
Military operations involving Vietnam
Military operations involving France
Battles and operations of the First Indochina War
1952 in French Indochina
1953 in French Indochina
1952 in Vietnam
1953 in Vietnam
December 1952 events in Asia
January 1953 events in Asia
History of Nam Định Province